Aaron Kitchell (July 10, 1744June 25, 1820) was a blacksmith and politician from Hanover Township, New Jersey. He represented New Jersey in both the United States House of Representatives and the Senate.

Early life and education
Born in Hanover in the Province of New Jersey, he attended the common schools and became a blacksmith.

Political career
He was a member of the New Jersey General Assembly in 1781–1782, 1784, 1786–1790, 1793–1794, 1797, 1801–1804, and 1809.

He was elected to the Second Congress (March 4, 1791 – March 3, 1793) and to the Third Congress to fill the vacancy caused by the death of Abraham Clark and was reelected to the Fourth Congress, serving from January 29, 1795, to March 3, 1797.

He resumed his former business activities and was elected to the Sixth Congress (March 4, 1799 – March 3, 1801). He was then elected as a Democratic Republican to the U.S. Senate and served from March 4, 1805, to March 12, 1809, when he resigned

Kitchell died in Hanover on June 25, 1820, and was interred there in the churchyard of the Presbyterian Church.

External links

Aaron Kitchell at The Political Graveyard

1744 births
1820 deaths
Members of the New Jersey General Assembly
People from Hanover Township, New Jersey
United States senators from New Jersey
New Jersey Federalists
Democratic-Republican Party United States senators
Federalist Party members of the United States House of Representatives
Democratic-Republican Party members of the United States House of Representatives from New Jersey
People of colonial New Jersey